"Waka", is a song by Tanzanian bongo flava recording artist and dancer Diamond Platnumz, featuring American rapper Rick Ross. The song was made available for streaming and digital download on iTunes and various online music platforms on 1 December 2017. "Waka" is an Afropop song produced by Laizer.

Background and release 
Waka was written by Diamond Platnumz and produced by Laizer under the label WCB Wasafi (Wasafi Classic Baby).

Music video
The music video for "Waka" was released on Dec 7, 2017 through Diamond Platnumz's official YouTube account. The video was shot and directed by Nigerian Director, Moe Musa in Miami, Florida (United States of America).

Release History

Video release history

Audio release

Crew

Song credits
Writing - Diamond Platnumz
Production - Wasafi Classic Baby
Video credits 
Director - Moe Musa

References

External links

Waka Lyrics 
Waka Lyrics

2017 songs
Diamond Platnumz songs
Tanzanian songs